Penicillium osmophilum is a species of fungus in the genus Penicillium which was isolated from agricultural soil in Wageningen in the Netherlands

References

Further reading
 
 

osmophilum
Fungi described in 1974